Stary Dvor is a rural locality (a selo) in Novoalexandrovskoye Rural Settlement, Suzdalsky District, Vladimir Oblast, Russia. The population was 775 as of 2010. There are 11 streets.

Geography 
Stary Dvor is located 25 km southwest of Suzdal (the district's administrative centre) by road. Vorontsovo is the nearest rural locality.

References 

Rural localities in Suzdalsky District
Vladimirsky Uyezd